NNC-711 is an anticonvulsant, acting as a gamma-aminobutyric acid uptake inhibitor via inhibition of GAT-1.

References

Anticonvulsants
Ketoximes
Carboxylic acids